Theater Baden-Baden  at Goetheplatz is the city theater of Baden-Baden in Baden-Württemberg, Germany.

At the instigation of Edouard Bénazet, a former casino director, the theater was modeled on the Paris Opera by Charles Couteau.

Especially for the opening in August 1862 Hector Berlioz composed the opera Béatrice et Bénédict after Shakespeare's Much Ado About Nothing. In 1869 Jacques Offenbach conducted the premiere of his operetta La princesse de Trébizonde.

Since 1918 the theater has had an ensemble of permanently employed actors. Opera and other works of the musical theater are also performed as part of guest performances and co-productions.
At the beginning of the 1990s the theater was completely renovated and equipped with modern technology.

The theater is one of the venues of the New Pop Festival. The premises, especially the foyer, can be rented for weddings and other events.

Theatres in Baden-Württemberg
Buildings and structures in Baden-Baden
1862 in Germany
Heritage sites in Baden-Württemberg